Xhonatan Lajthia (born 1 February 1999) is an Albanian professional footballer who plays as a midfielder for Albanian club KF Erzeni.

Club career

Early career
Lajthia started his youth career at KF Teuta Durrës in 2011. In the 2014–15 season he played 14 games with under-17 side.

Club career
On 3 January 2020, Lajthia returned to KF Erzeni on a contract for the rest of the season.

International career

Albania U16
He participated with Albania national under-16 football team in the UEFA Development Tournament 2015 and played 1 match under coach Alban Bushi on 3 May 2015.

Albania U19
He also was called up at Albania national under-19 football team by coach Arjan Bellaj to participate in the 2017 UEFA European Under-19 Championship qualification from 6-11 October 2016. He played in all three matches as a substitute.

Albania U20
He received his first call up for the Albania under-20 side by coach Alban Bushi for the double friendly match against Azerbaijan U-21 on 21 & 26 January 2018.

Honours

International 
Albania U16
UEFA Development Tournament: 2015

References

External links
 Xhonathan Lajthia profile FSHF.org
 
 

1999 births
Living people
Footballers from Kavajë
Albanian footballers
Association football midfielders
Albania youth international footballers
KF Teuta Durrës players
KF Erzeni players
KS Egnatia Rrogozhinë players
Kategoria Superiore players
Kategoria e Parë players